Gul-gukbap or oyster and rice soup is a type of gukbap (rice soup) made with oysters.

Preparation 
Shucked oysters along with garlic and tofu are added to anchovy stock that has been boiling with radish and salted shrimps. Scallions and enoki mushrooms are then added, followed by bap (cooked rice) and garlic chives.

See also 
 Haejangguk
 Oyster stew

References 

Korean soups and stews
Oyster dishes